Imran Muhammad Akhoond is a Pakistani guitarist, music composer songwriter. He is far famed as a Lead Guitarist for renowned Pakistani Pop Singer, Philanthropist and humanitarian, UNODC National Goodwill Ambassador Shehzad Roy. His incessant attitude towards exploring different Genres of music and the knack of fusing Eastern and Western music has earned him a reputation of one of the most aspiring musicians from Pakistan in different arenas around the Globe.

Imran Akhoond has also played lead guitar for many iconic Pakistani Bands and mainstream artists Like Junaid Jamshed, Strings and Vital Signs. 
Imran Akhoond.working with Shahi Hasan of Vital Signs for Pepsi Battle of the Bands Season 3 As Mentor. Imran Akhoond is played house member of Coke Studio Pakistan (Season 7,8,9,10) produced by Strings. In 2013 he became the only guitarist from Pakistan to perform with American hard Rock band Guns N' Roses team includes Guitarist Slash and drummer Matt Sorum at Los Angeles USA for a Charitable cause.
2018 worked for shahi hasan teams as mentor for Pepsi Battle of the Bands Season 3  
Currently working with Shahi Hasan ( Vital Signs ) Pepsi Battle of the Bands Season 4 as Mentor

Early life
Imran Akhoond was born in Karachi. He is self-taught guitarist. Currently, he is a band-member of the very popular singer Shehzad Roy from last 24 years. Before that, he also played with Junaid Jamshed, Awaz, Vital Signs & Strings.

Music career

Shehzad Roy
Imran Akhoond started his music career in 1990. He became a permanent member of Shehzad Roy in 1998.

Coke Studio Pakistan (Seasons 7,8,9,10)
Imran Akhoond played in Coke Studio Pakistan Team member of Coke Studio Pakistan (Season 7,8,9,10) 
as Guitarist (Produced by Strings) and is one of the house band members
2018 worked for shahi hasan teams as mentor for Pepsi Battle of the Bands Season 3  
Currently working with Shahi Hasan ( Vital Signs ) Pepsi Battle of the Bands Season 4 as Mentor

Other Ventures
Imran Akhoond did a gig with Junaid jamshed, Awaz and usa tour with Strings in 2009

Session work
Imran Akhoond has done extensive session work contributing his guitar work to albums by Shehzad Roy, Ali Zafar,

Strings, Shafqat Amanat Ali.Faakhir,

Discography
 1999 – Shehzad Roy Teri soorat Album
 2002 – Shehzad Roy Rab Janey Album
 2005 – Shehzad Roy Buri Baat hai Album
 2008 – Shehzad Roy Qismat Apne Haath Mein Album
 2008 – Shafqat Amanat Ali  Tabeer Album
 2008 – Strings  Koi Aany Wala Hai Album 
 2010 – Atif Aslam & Strings Ab khud kuch karna paray ga
 2011 – Ali Azmat Josh-ejunoon
 2013 – Rahat Nusrat Fateh Ali Khan Malaal ( Movie Song )
 2014 – Ali Zafar – Nahi Maloom ( Movie Song )
 2015 – Moor(film) Guitar Scoring Background & Songs ( Produced by Strings )
 2016 – Actor in Law Guitar Scoring Background & Songs Produced by Shani Arshad )
 2017 – Shehzad Roy PSL Official Song Balle Balle  )
 2017 – Shehzad Roy PSL Official Anthem Dan Dhana Dhan  )
 2018 – Shahi Hasan Song Maula Pepsi Battle of the Bands Season 3 Episode 8 )
 2018 – Shehzad Roy PSL Official Song Lo Phir Se Miley )
 2018 – Shehzad Roy Karachi Kings Official Anthem Song De Dhana Dhan )
 2019 – Shehzad Roy Karachi Kings Official Anthem Song De Dhana Dhan )
 2019 – Shehzad Roy Official Song Socho Phir Se Zara for Supreme Court Symposium Produced by  )
 2020 – Kashan Admani Enlisted top musical talent from all over the world for a new song 'We Are One'[26] features 40 musicians from all over       
                                the world including Grammy Award winners Global Collaboration

References

 The Times of India – Coke Studio Pakistan (Season 7) (28 August 2014)
 coke studio launch 8 
 Pakistani news 
 Pak101.com 
Imran Akhond participated Djuice sponsored song "Kya Darta Hai" (23 December 2011) 
 Imran Akhoond details on Coke Stuido's official Website
 Imran Akhoond Express Tribune News
 Imran Akhoond Express Tribune News
 Coke Studio Season 7
 secretcloset news 
 Coke Studio Season 8
 Coke Studio Season 9
  Coke Studio Season 10 
 Dawns News Articles Coke studio 
 Scroll in press coke studio team  
 Youline Magazine coke studio 
 Coke Studio Images Dawn news   
 Coke studio Interviews  

 Pakistan Today News
 Dawn news 2018 article by shehzad roy
 Dawn news article imran akhoond
 Patari 2018
 coke studio 8 
 Dawn news 2018 
  Pepsi Battle of The Bands Season 3 Apniisp news 2018 
 Tribune Article 2019
 Propakistani Entertainment News 2019
 Mangobass News 2019
 Daily Pakistan Article 2019
 Siasat.pk blog
 Pakistan press foundation
  hip Article 2019
 Hamariweb Article 2019
 Socialpakistan Article 2019
  News Summed up 2019
 National courier news 2019 
 How grammy-winning artists came together for a 'dua' to end Covid-19  Tribune Article 2020 
 40 Artists across 7 countries share one message in the single, ‘We Are One’/Aae Khuda The News On Sunday Article 2020 
   Grammy Winning Artists and Pakistani Musicians Release Ae Khuda Runway Article 2020

Notes

External links 
 
 Dawn News

Pakistani guitarists
Pakistani pop singers
21st-century Pakistani male singers
Pakistani Sunni Muslims
Musicians from Karachi
1971 births
Living people
21st-century guitarists